Passamaquoddy Indian Township Reservation (Maliseet-Passamaquoddy: Motahkomikuk) is one of two Indian reservations of the federally recognized Passamaquoddy tribe in Washington County, Maine, United States. The population was 760 at the 2020 census. Most of the 2,500 members of the tribe in the United States live in other parts of Maine. The reservation is located about 13 miles west-northwest of the city of Calais.

The Passamaquoddy also reside on the Pleasant Point Reservation.

Geography
According to the United States Census Bureau, the Indian Township reservation has a total area of 112.5 km2 (43.4 mi2). 97.0 km2 (37.5 mi2) of it is land and 15.5 km2 (6.0 mi2) of it (13.77%) is water.

Demographics

As of the census of 2000, there were 676 people, 232 households, and 164 families residing in the Indian reservation. The population density was 18.1/mi2 (7.0/km2). There were 261 housing units at an average density of 7.0/mi2 (2.7/km2). The racial makeup of the Indian reservation was 11.54% White, 83.43% Native American, and 5.03% from two or more races. Hispanic or Latino of any race were 0.74% of the population.

There were 232 households, out of which 48.3% had children under the age of 18 living with them, 35.8% were married couples living together, 23.3% had a female householder with no husband present, and 28.9% were non-families. 25.0% of all households were made up of individuals, and 7.8% had someone living alone who was 65 years of age or older. The average household size was 2.91 and the average family size was 3.40.

In the Indian reservation the population was spread out, with 40.5% under the age of 18, 9.8% from 18 to 24, 30.2% from 25 to 44, 14.3% from 45 to 64, and 5.2% who were 65 years of age or older. The median age was 25 years. For every 100 females there were 107.4 males. For every 100 females age 18 and over, there were 95.1 males.

The median income for a household in the Indian reservation was $23,125, and the median income for a family was $28,654. Males had a median income of $21,696 versus $24,271 for females. The per capita income for the Indian reservation was $10,808. About 23.0% of families and 24.6% of the population were below the poverty line, including 22.5% of those under age 18 and 27.8% of those age 65 or over.

Notable residents 
 Mary Mitchell Gabriel (1908–2004), basket maker
 Tomah Joseph (1837–1914), governor, guide, and artist
 Geo Neptune, basket maker
 Molly Neptune Parker, basket maker

References

External links
 Four Directions Development Corporation
 Passamaquoddy Tribe - Pleasant Point & Indian Township Reservations- EPA Tribal Program in New England Portal
 "Passamaquoddy Tribe Indian Township, Wabanaki Trails

American Indian reservations in Maine
Geography of Washington County, Maine